The 1902–03 collegiate men's basketball season in the United States began in December 1902, progressed through the regular season, and concluded in March 1903.

Season headlines 

 Minnesota (13–0) went undefeated for the second consecutive season.
 In February 1943, the Helms Athletic Foundation retroactively selected Yale as its national champion for the 1903–04 season.
 In 1995, the Premo-Porretta Power Poll retroactively selected Minnesota as its national champion for the 1903–04 season.

Regular season

Conference winners 

NOTE: The Western Conference (the future Big Ten Conference) did not sponsor an official conference season or recognize a regular-season champion until the 1905–06 season. In 1902–03, Minnesota (13–0) and Purdue (8–0) both went undefeated.

Statistical leaders

Coaching changes

References